Darius L. Bancroft was a member of the Wisconsin State Assembly.

Biography
Bancroft was born on February 15, 1819, in New Berlin, New York. On September 3, 1843, he married Sarah Merriam. They would have nine children. Bancroft settled in Chester, Wisconsin, in 1845.

Career
Bancroft was a member of the Assembly during the Sessions of 1852 and 1874. Additionally, he was Superintendent of Schools, Town Clerk and Chairman of the Town Board of Chester. Originally a Whig, he later became a Republican.

References

People from New Berlin, New York
People from Dodge County, Wisconsin
Mayors of places in Wisconsin
Members of the Wisconsin State Assembly
City and town clerks
Wisconsin Republicans
Wisconsin Whigs
19th-century American politicians
1819 births
Year of death missing